Kalabond Oval is a sporting oval in Kokopo, East New Britain Province, Papua New Guinea. It is home to rugby league team Agmark Gurias and has a capacity of just over 5,000 spectators. The stadium sits on the foot of an active volcano, Tavurvur.

History
In 2013, the stadium played host to the PNG vs Australia PM's XIII, the stadium will be home to the PNG Hunters in the Queensland Cup in 2014.

In October 2014 the stadium will host the 2014 OFC Women's Nations Cup.

References

Rugby league stadiums in Papua New Guinea
Papua New Guinea Hunters